The 2002 Svenska Cupen final took place on 9 November 2002 at Råsunda Stadium in Solna. The match was contested by the Stockholm rivals AIK and Allsvenskan champions Djurgården. Substitute Louay Chanko scored the winning goal in extra time after a pass from Johan Elmander and secured "The Double" for Djurgården.

Road to the Final

Match details

External links
Svenska Cupen at svenskfotboll.se

2002
Cupen
Djurgårdens IF Fotboll matches
AIK Fotboll matches
Football in Stockholm
November 2002 sports events in Europe